Arkady Malisov (born 10 March 1967) is a Russian former professional football player. 

Malisov made two appearances for FC Lokomotiv Nizhny Novgorod in the 1993 Russian Top League.

External links

1967 births
Footballers from Tbilisi
Living people
Russian footballers
Soviet footballers
Russian Premier League players
FC Lokomotiv Nizhny Novgorod players
Association football goalkeepers